This articles concerns the educational institutions of Penang. There are 271 primary schools and 125 secondary schools in Penang.

English Schools

Penang boasts of a good system of education stretching back to the early days of the British administration. Many of the public schools in Penang are among the oldest in the country and even in the region as a whole. Most notable of these are:
 Penang Free School, the oldest English school in the country. This is the former school of Tunku Abdul Rahman, the nation's founding Prime Minister, a Perlis Ruler, the legendary Malaysian actor/singer Tan Sri P.Ramlee, the present king, as well as numerous great personalities of the nation (founded in 1816 by Anglican missionaries).
 St. Xavier's Institution, also one of the oldest and most established schools in Malaysia that is at the forefront of the Malaysian education scene, both academically and co-curricularly.
 Convent Light Street, also the oldest girls' school in Penang with resides side to side with St. Xavier's Institution

These pioneer schools formed the backbone of Malaysia's early education system which has educated generations of rulers, prime ministers, chief ministers, lawmakers, politicians, professionals and people of social standing.

Fully residential schools/ Sekolah berasrama penuh (SBP)
 Sekolah Menengah Sains Tun Syed Sheh Shahabudin
 Sekolah Menengah Sains Kepala Batas

MARA Junior Science College
 MJSC Balik Pulau
 MJSC Ulul Albab Kepala Batas
 MJSC Transkrian

Chinese schools

Penang Chinese school has also long been the centre of a well-developed schooling system. These schools were set up by local Chinese associations with donations from philanthropists, and have historically attracted students from Chinese communities in Thailand and Indonesia, where Chinese education was banned.
 Chung Ling High School, (founded 9 February 1917) the alma mater of Penang's ex-Chief Minister, Singapore's Minister of Health and one of the key education institutions that help built the nation and the region of South East Asia.
 Heng Ee School, was founded in 1952 by Datuk Father Arthur Julian, a Belgian missionary who arrived Penang from China in 1952. He established Heng Ee Primary School in 1952, followed by Heng Ee High School in 1957 then 1969, Heng Ee Kindergarten.
 Penang Chinese Girls' High School, founded by four prominent members of the Hokkien community, Mr Tan Sin Chen, Mr Lim Lu Teck, Mr Khor Sen Lee and Mr Cheah Seng Tin on 8 March 1920.
 Union High School,(founded 1928) Union was founded by some charitable Christian believers. During 1942 Japanese colonisation, Union had been occupied by Japanese military use. One of the all-girls schools in Penang.
 Jit Sin School, is founded by an organisation, Fu De Zheng Shen, in 1818. Later, the school has developed into the Jit Sin Primary School - A and B school, Jit Sin High School, Jit Sin (Private) High School and Jit Sin Kindergarten.
 Chung Hwa Confucian High School (founded 1904) is one of the oldest formal Chinese Schools in Malaysia and is the first to use Mandarin as the medium of instruction instead of the Chinese dialects.
 Phor Tay High School, (founded 1940) is the first Buddhism's school in Malaysia.
 Jit Sin High School started in 1949 and shared the same history of Jit Sin School. They have set the benchmark for all government examinations - PMR, SPM & STPM, and all kinds of inter-school competitions, especially Chinese Orchestra.
 Han Chiang School, was founded in 1919 by notable businessman Lim Lean Teng and The Teochew Association of Penang. Today, Han Chiang consists of 3 schools: SJK(C) Han Chiang, Han Chiang High School, Han Chiang College who excel in various categories. Han Chiang is also the first school in Malaysia to provide education from primary level to college level.
 Convent Datuk Keramat, was founded by Rev. Mother Tarcisius in 1935.

International schools
 , Dalat International School
 , The International School of Penang (Uplands)
 , St. Christopher's International Primary School
 Tenby International School
 , Fairview International School
 , The Prince of Wales Island International School
 Straits International School

Tertiary Education

Universities
 Universiti Sains Malaysia (USM)
 Universiti Teknologi MARA (UiTM) Permatang Pauh
 Wawasan Open University (WOU)
 Royal College of Surgeons in Ireland and University College Dublin Malaysia Campus (RUMC)
 Tunku Abdul Rahman University College (TARUC) Penang Campus
 Han Chiang University College of Communication

Private Colleges
 Adventist College of Nursing and Health Sciences
 Cosmopoint College of Technology
 DISTED College
 Equator Academy of Art
 FRIS Engineering Institute
 Info Genius College
 INTI International College Penang
 Island College of Technology
 KDU College Penang
 Kemayan ATC
 Lam Wah Ee Nursing College
 Olympia College Penang
 Penang Skills Development Centre (PSDC)
 PTPL Penang
 Reliance College
 RIMA College
 SEGi College
 Sentral College

Polytechnics
 Politeknik Seberang Perai
 Politeknik Balik Pulau
 Politeknik METrO Tasek Gelugor

References